Turie Pole was a village of the Zvolen District in the modern-day Banská Bystrica Region of Slovakia.  It was founded in 1337. In 1951 the people of Tŭri Pôle were forcibly displaced, as part of the establishment of the Lešť unincorporated area, which has since then served as a military training area.

Painter Jan Matulka visited often and made many paintings of the landscape and scenery. One of the paintings records the name of the village under the intentional stylistic variation Tŭri Pôle.

References

External links
Satellite map of Turie Pole

Villages and municipalities in Zvolen District
Former villages in Slovakia